Rev Jayawardene Welatantrige Edwin Boteju was a Ceylonese Christian Clergyman and legislator. He was elected unofficial member of the Legislative Council of Ceylon representing the Sabaragamuwa Province in the 1921 legislative council election.

References

20th-century Sri Lankan people

Members of the Legislative Council of Ceylon
Sinhalese politicians
Sinhalese priests
Sri Lankan Anglican priests